John West was a 50-year-old African-American man who was lynched in Guernsey, Hempstead County, Arkansas by a group of men on the Hope-Texarkana train on July 28, 1922. According to the United States Senate Committee on the Judiciary it was the 41st of 61 lynchings during 1922 in the United States.

Background

John West was born in Emporia, Kansas and had moved to Hope, Arkansas two weeks prior to his murder. He
The contemporary media noted that he wore his beard in goatee fashion.

Andrew Worthing and John West worked for the Kaw Paving Company, which engaged in street paving work in Hope, Arkansas. A fight broke out over the crew's common drinking cup and the statement that West was as good as any white worker. At one point West struck Worthing with a sledgehammer but "the white man was not dangerously injured."

Both were arrested and taken before the major who fined them both for disturbing the peace. As word spread of the fight West was warned to leave town. He bought a ticket for Texarkana ( away), and boarded the Missouri Pacific train No. 35 at 1:45 PM.

Lynching 
The train travelled  before a crowd of white men forced him off the train, at the Guernsey train station, and into a grove  from the station. A series of shots were heard and John West's body was found riddled with bullet holes. The newspaper The Little River News reported that West was probably "shot after he flourished a pistol and threatened the men who intended only to whip him."  The same paper noted that a .38 calibre revolver was discovered in his left hand.

National memorial 

The National Memorial for Peace and Justice opened in Montgomery, Alabama, on April 26, 2018. Featured among other things is the Memorial Corridor which displays 805 hanging steel rectangles, each representing the counties in the United States where a documented lynching took place and, for each county, the names of those lynched. The memorial hopes that communities, like Hempstead County, Arkansas where John West was lynched, will take these slabs and install them in their own communities.

See also

On March 15, 1921, Brownie Tuggles was lynched, in Hope, Hempstead County, Arkansas, after being accused of assaulting a white woman.

References 
Notes

Bibliography 

 

1922 riots
1922 in Arkansas
African-American history of Arkansas
Lynching deaths in Arkansas 
February 1922 events
Protest-related deaths
Racially motivated violence against African Americans 
Riots and civil disorder in Arkansas 
White American riots in the United States
Hempstead County, Arkansas